Ivo Hamilton Hobson (29 December 1990) is an English former first-class cricketer.

Hobson was born at Lambeth in 1991. He was educated at Eton College, before going up to Durham University. While studying at Durham, he played two first-class cricket matches for Durham MCCU against Durham and Nottinghamshire in 2013. He tried hard against first-class county opposition, scoring just 17 runs in four innings'.

References

External links

1990 births
Living people
People from Lambeth
People educated at Eton College
Alumni of Durham University
English cricketers
Durham MCCU cricketers